The 1940 United States presidential election in Indiana took place on November 5, 1940, as part of the 1940 United States presidential election. State voters chose 14 representatives, or electors, to the Electoral College, who voted for president and vice president.

Indiana was won by Wendell Willkie (R–New York), running with Senate Minority Leader Charles L. McNary of Oregon, with 50.45% of the popular vote, against incumbent President Franklin D. Roosevelt (D–New York), running with Secretary of Agriculture Henry A. Wallace, with 49.03% of the popular vote.

Results

Results by county

See also
 United States presidential elections in Indiana

References

Indiana
1940
1940 Indiana elections